Needlerun net is a family of laces created by using a needle to embroider on a net ground. 

Along with Tambour lace this became more popular with the advent of machine made netting.

It is used in Limerick lace.

References

Needle lace
Net fabrics